Ravi Subramanian is an Indian author. A banker by profession, he has written popular thrillers about banking and bankers, including award winning trilogy The Incredible Banker, The Bankster and Bankerupt. An alumnus of IIM Bangalore, batch of 1993, Subramanian spent close to two decades in the financial services industry. After having worked with companies such as Citibank, HSBC and ANZ Grindlays, he is now the CEO of a listed Non-banking financial company.

Subramanian writes popular columns for well-known magazines and has his own personal weekly column in the career and business life page of The Economic Times. He says "I will be satisfied if people remember me as the Grisham of banking," referring to the American author best known for his legal thrillers.

His daughter Anusha Subramanian has been a published author since the age of 12.

Works
If God Was a Banker (2007)
I Bought the Monk’s Ferrari (2008)
Devil in Pinstripes (2010)
The Incredible Banker (2011)
The Bankster (2012)
Bankerupt (2013)
God is a Gamer (2014)
The Bestseller She Wrote (2015)
In the Name of God (2017)
Don't tell the Governor (2018)

Awards and honors
Indiaplaza Golden Quill Book Award (2008), If God Was a Banker
Crossword Best of 2010, Devil in Pinstripes
Crossword Book Award (2011), The Incredible Banker
Crossword Book Award (2012), The Bankster
Best of Leadership Writing from The Economic Times
Crossword Book Award (2015), Bankerupt

References

External links
Ravi Subramanian at Penguin India
 Rich People Often Lead Glamorous Lives, Full of Intrigue: Ravi Subramanian 

Living people
Writers from Bangalore
Indian Institute of Management Bangalore alumni
Year of birth missing (living people)